The mining sector contributes only 0.1% to the GDP of Uruguay. Uruguay's mineral commodities include clays, semiprecious gemstones, gold, iron and steel, sand and gravel, and stone. Uruguay has no proven natural gas or oil reserves but it does have substantial hydroelectric capacity.

Structure of the Mineral Industry
The mineral industry of Uruguay mostly consisted of Uruguayan state-owned firms. The structure of the country's mineral industry could change to a privately owned, government-regulated regime from one that was government owned and government operated. Foreign direct investment (FdI) inflows to Mercosur had a positive effect on Uruguay's FdI inflows, which increased to $1.4 billion in 2006 
from $847.4 million in 2005, and that mostly reflected the high international prices of several commodities, such as cement, steel, sugar, textiles, and wood products.

Commodities

Gold
In 2006, gold production in Uruguay remained about the same level as that of 2005.

Iron and Steel
Uruguay produced 57,000 t of crude steel in 2006 compared with 64,000 t in 2005, which was a decrease of 10.9%. The increase in metal prices and higher output of iron ore did not provide the necessary boost to the steel sector. according to the Uruguayan Dirección Nacional de Minería y Geología, the country produced 15,525 t of iron ore in 2006 compared with 12,436 t in 2005, which was an increase of almost 25%.

Natural gas
In June 2006, the administración nacional de Combustibles, alcohol y Portland (anCaP) announced the completion of an appraisal of natural gas reserves in Uruguay's offshore Punta del Este basin. according to anCaP, the basin contained at least  of potential reserves and first production could take place as early as 2015 provided that exploration takes place in the basin.

Two natural gas pipelines connect Uruguay and Argentina. The first, Cr. The second, the gasoducto Cruz del Sur (gCdS), was operated by a consortium led by British Gas group (Bg group). Argentina, however, had begun to disrupt its natural gas exports to Chile and Uruguay because of natural gas output shortages. as a 
result, Uruguay approached the Bolivian government to discuss the possibility of direct supply of natural gas. In March 2006, both governments agreed to conduct a feasibility study of such a plan.

Petroleum

References

External links
Mining in Uruguay (in Spanish)

Economy of Uruguay